Sayed Mahdi Baqer Jaafar Mahdi Naser (born 14 April 1994) is a Bahraini footballer who plays as a defender for Riffa and the Bahrain national team.

International career
Baqer made his senior international debut on 7 October 2016 in a 3–1 friendly victory over Philippines. Baqer was included in Bahrain's squad for the 2019 AFC Asian Cup in the United Arab Emirates.

On 14 November 2019, Baqer made a "slit eye" gesture towards the Hong Kong fans in the end of the 2022 FIFA World Cup qualifying match between Hong Kong and Bahrain. On 19 December 2019, FIFA banned Baqer for 10 matches and fined him CHF 30,000 as a punishment for his "discriminatory behaviour".

Career statistics

International

References

External links
 
 
 
 
 Sayed Baqer at WorldFootball.com

1994 births
Living people
Sportspeople from Manama
Bahraini footballers
Bahrain international footballers
Association football defenders
Al-Ahli Club (Manama) players
Al-Nasr SC (Kuwait) players
Bahraini Premier League players
Kuwait Premier League players
2019 AFC Asian Cup players
Riffa SC players
Expatriate footballers in Kuwait
Bahraini expatriate footballers
Bahraini expatriate sportspeople in Kuwait